Hypersara is a genus of parasitic flies in the family Tachinidae.

Species
Iconofrontina minthoidea Townsend, 1931

Distribution
Argentina.

References

Diptera of North America
Endemic fauna of Argentina
Exoristinae
Tachinidae genera
Taxa named by Charles Henry Tyler Townsend
Monotypic Brachycera genera